The Darlinettes were a jazz band formed in 1942 by students at the Woman's College of the University of North Carolina, as part of a trend of shifting gender roles in music at the US homefront during World War II.

History 
In 1945, in addition to playing for various organizations, The Darlinettes performed at the University of North Carolina at Greensboro's Junior Prom.

Members of The Darlinettes included Audra Clinard Foil, Jean Hester McMillan and Mary Montague Watts.

Concurrently with its band, the school also had a The Rhythmettes vocal group.

There is a Darlinettes Artist in Residence Endowment Fund at the University of North Carolina at Greensboro in their honor.

References

External links 
 
 

American jazz ensembles
All-female bands
Musical groups from North Carolina
Musical groups established in 1942
Musical groups disestablished in 1953
University of North Carolina at Greensboro
Articles containing video clips
Jazz musicians from North Carolina
1942 establishments in North Carolina